James of Portugal (17 September 1433 – 27 August 1459), also known as James of Coimbra, James of Lusitania,  was a Portuguese infante (prince) of the House of Aviz, and a bishop and cardinal of the Roman Catholic Church.

James was the 3rd son of Infante Pedro, Duke of Coimbra, and Isabella of Urgell. At the age of just 14, he took part in the battle of Alfarrobeira (1449) where his father's army was defeated by the Portuguese royal army.

James was taken captive after the battle, but he escaped and, together with his brother John and his sister Beatrice, took refuge in Burgundy, under the protection of his aunt, Isabella of Portugal (the consort of Duke Philip III the Good).

James of Portugal studied in Flanders and, on 23 March 1453, was appointed Bishop of Arras. On his aunt’s advice, he traveled to Rome, where Pope Nicholas V, hearing of the disgraces inflicted upon his family after Alfarrobeira, resolved to appoint the young James as the new Archbishop of Lisbon, which had been recently vacated by the death of D. Luís Coutinho.  However, not being old enough to be consecrated to the dignity, James was only appointed administrator in perpetuity of the Archdiocese on 30 April 1453.  Given the political situation in Portugal, James was unable to return to Lisbon to take possession of it, and so remained in Italy and governed his archdiocese from afar, via the vicar-general Luís Anes.

Nicholas V having died in early 1455, the new Pope Calixtus III elevated James to a cardinal-deacon of the Church (despite not having the requisite 30 years of age for the office), assigning him the titular diaconate of Santa Maria in Portico Octaviae, soon substituted for the diaconate of Sant'Eustachio.  Callixtus III also gave James the Bishopric of Paphos, in Cyprus, where his brother, John, had married Charlotte of Lusignan, Princess of Cyprus.

Following the death of Callixtus III, James of Portugal participated in the conclave that elected Pius II as the new pope. He was appointed a Knight of the Order of the Golden Fleece, number 58, at the 9th Chapter of the order, held in 1456 at The Hague.

While travelling from Rome to Mantua, James of Portugal fell ill and died in Florence on 27 August 1459, at the age of twenty-five. He was buried in the basilica of San Miniato al Monte in Florence, the only tomb in that church. Some of the best artists in Renaissance Florence were commissioned to design and decorate the chapel of the "Cardinale del Portogallo" in San Miniato.

Portuguese art historian António Bélard da Fonseca, in his multi-volume O Mistério dos Painéis (1957-1967), controversially claimed that it is James of Portugal, and not St. Vincent, who is depicted as the radiant saintly figure in the central panels of the famous Saint Vincent Panels of Nuno Gonçalves.

Ancestry

References
"Nobreza de Portugal e Brasil", Vol. I, page 271. Published by Zairol Lda., Lisbon, 1989

External links
Genealogical information on Jaime of Portugal 
"Jaime Cardinal de Portugal" Catholic-Hierarchy.org. David M. Cheney. Retrieved February 29, 2016

1433 births
1459 deaths
15th-century Portuguese cardinals
House of Aviz
Knights of the Golden Fleece
Portuguese infantes
Archbishops of Lisbon
Bishops of Arras